Pondok Aren (abbreviated as Pd. Aren) is a district in South Tangerang City, Banten Province, Indonesia. It is located on the south-western outskirts of Jakarta. The area covers 29.88 km2 and had a population at the 2020 Census of 294,996. Pondok Aren district mainly covers the area of Bintaro Jaya and borders South Jakarta to the east. Pondok Aren district office is located at Jl. Graha Raya Bintaro, Perigi Baru behind the Pondok Aren Sectoral Police office (Polsek Pondok Aren). 

Sectors 3-9 housing of Bintaro Jaya real estate lies in this area, while sectors 1-2 of Bintaro Jaya is already partly demographically located in South Jakarta and East Ciputat district.

Infrastructures

International Education
The British School Jakarta, The Jakarta Japanese School (ジャカルタ日本人学校), Global Jaya International School, and Mentari Intercultural School is located at this district. 

There are also other national and public schools in this district.

Shopping Centers
Plaza Bintaro
Bintaro X-Change Mall
Lotte Mart
Bintaro Entertainment Center (BEC) (Defunct)
Bintaro Modern Market/Pasar Modern
Freshmarket Emerald Bintaro
Transpark Mall Bintaro
Giant Hypermarket
Living Plaza Bintaro
Hero Supermarket
Electronic City
Gramedia

Hotels 

 Santika Hotel
 Aviary Bintaro
 Citra Dream Hotel Bintaro

Hospitals
Pondok Indah Bintaro Jaya hospital
Premier Bintaro Hospital
Ihsan Medical Center
Mitra Keluarga hospital
RSIA Bina Medika Bintaro

Police
 POLSEK PONDOK AREN, is the district police of Pondok Aren which covers Bintaro Jaya sector 3–9. The police office is located at Jl. Graha Raya Bintaro, Perigi Baru. 
 POLSUBSEKTOR BINTARO 5, is a police station located at Jl. Bintaro Utama 5, Bintaro Jaya sector 5.

Fire and Rescue
The South Tangerang Fire and Rescue service covers this area. A fire station is available for Pondok Aren district which is located beside the Bintaro Plaza. Their phone number is 0811-900-074 and is available 24 hours

Housing area
Jurang Mangu Barat
Jurang Mangu Timur
Pondok Kacang Timur
Pondok Kacang Barat
Perigi Lama
Perigi Baru
Pondok Karya
Pondok Jaya
Pondok Betung
Pondok Pucung
Pondok Aren

Transportation
Trans Bintaro Jaya bus to FX Sudirman mall
RoyalTrans by Transjakarta (Bintaro Jaya Xchange - Fatmawati MRT Station)
Angkot C05 to Kebayoran Lama (via Ulujami - Bintaro Permai)
Angkot C12 to Kebayoran Lama (via Cipadu)
Angkot S06 to Kebayoran Lama (via Taman Puring - Ulujami - Bintaro Permai)
Angkot D10 to Ciputat
Angkot C02 Ciputat-Ciledug via Pondok Aren - Jombang
Angkot C11 BSD-Ciledug via Parigi - Pondok Kacang Timur
KRL (Electrical Train) Sudimara station to Maja
KRL (Electric Railway Train) Sudimara station to Tanah Abang, Central Jakarta.
KRL (Electric Railway Train) station Jurangmangu to Maja
KRL (Railway Train) Jurangmangu Station to Tanah Abang, Central Jakarta.
KRL (Electric Railway Train) Pondok Ranji station to Maja
KRL (Electric Railway Train) Pondok Ranji station to Tanah Abang, Central Jakarta.

References

South Tangerang
Populated places in Banten